Mykola Lebid (5 May 1936 – 29 March 2007) was a Ukrainian painter, graphic artist, designer, Honored Artist of Ukraine, and professor, known for watercolor paintings, graphics, design, medal art. Winner of Nikolai Ostrovsky Premium in 1986.

Life 

Mykola Lebid was born on 5 May 1936 in small village of Kustine, Sumy region, Ukrainian SSR (now Ukraine). Father – Yakiv Lebid (1896–1947) was a railroad worker, fought in the Red Army during World War II, was wounded and died shortly after the war ended. Mother – Eudokia Lebid (Radchenko) (1898-19??). The family had six children. Two older brothers died during the Holodomor of the 1930s. The elder brother Danilo Lebid, went missing in November 1943. Prior to that he was awarded two medals "For Courage". After the war, the older sisters Galina, Maria and the youngest Mykola lived with their mother.

Following his education at the Leningrad Vera Mukhina Higher School of Art and Design (1957-1963), Mykola Lebid worked as an art-designer of the "Ukrdipromebli" Institute and the Institute of Technical Aesthetics in Kyiv (1964–1967). Lebid was a chief artist of the "Ukrtorgreklama" (1966–1973). He has been the member of the Ukrainian Artists Union since 1967.

Mykola is an author of the Khreshchatyk street holiday lighting (1967–1977). Mykola Lebid created a series of lamps for public institutions; musical instruments for Chernihiv and Zhytomyr musical factories (in particular, the famous piano "Ukraine"); children's wooden toys and souvenirs, which were produced in the 1960-1970s at the Chernihiv and Kyiv factories. Radio receivers "Olimpik", "Olimpik-401" are designed by Mykola Lebid (1977). Lebid is an author of cutlery made of gold and silver, souvenirs made by the "Ukrsamotsvity" jewelry factory, watch design, filmoscopes, loudspeakers, and other household products. They are copyrighted and produced since the 1970s, some were produced up to the 2000s.

Since the 1980s, Mykola Lebid has been engaged in environmental and landscape design. Comprehensive presentation of Ukraine at the 12th World Festival of Youth and Students in Moscow, 1985 (M. Ostrovsky Prize, 1986). Small architectural forms and history museum in Varva (1986–1990). Memorial "Defenders of the Motherland" in Borova (1987). Belgorod Central Park (Russia, 1988), ukrainian-russian restaurant in Dubai (UAE, 1996), etc.

In the field of graphics, M. Lebid developed the corporate style of the "Science" club of the Academy of Sciences of Ukraine (1980–1983). He is an author of series of commemorative medals and badges for Kiev radio plant "Slavutich" (1982–1989). In 1992 Mykola Lebid received the honorary title of Honored Artist of Ukraine. In 1999 in tight competition M. Lebid became the author of the state award Order "For Courage" and about twenty departmental awards. In 1999 he was nominated for the honorary title of People's Artist of Ukraine.

Watercolor paintings of Mykola Lebid are among the best created in this technique by contemporary artists. Are written alla prima, extremely transparent, passionate and at the same time are in logical design, rhythm and composition. Both in painting and in design Mykola Lebid does not copy the objects of nature, but expresses the regularities by all means available. Watercolor paintings were exhibited at numerous personal and group exhibitions. Paintings by M. Lebid can be found in private collections throughout the US, United Kingdom, Poland, Czech Republic, Slovakia, Canada, Ukraine, Germany, United Arab Emirates, Austria, Belgium, Netherlands, Russia and others.

During last years of life, Mykola Lebid passed on his skills to students of the Institute of Interior Design and Landscape (National Academy of Government Managerial Staff of Culture and Arts).

He died at his home in Kiev on 29 March 2007, surrounded by his family.

Selected works 

 a series of watercolor paintings in own exquisite technique. Рainted throughout his life
 musical instruments for the Chernihiv and Zhytomyr music factories, including the famous piano "Ukraine" (1966–68);
 holiday lighting design of Khreshchatyk (1967–77);
 children wooden toys (1968–71);
 souvenirs "1500 years of Kyiv", inlay with straw (1973);
 cutlery of gold and silver (1974);
 souvenirs for the "Ukrainian Gems" factory (1975);
 radio receiver "Olimpik", "Olimpik-401" (1977);
 electronic digital clocks, two F-7 film projectors, three household speakers (all co-author), a Stop-Test device (awarded by the USSR Exhibition of Achievements of National Economy medal), a portable tourist gas tile (all 1976–79);
 socio-cultural complex of Ukraine in 12th World Festival of Youth and Students in Moscow (1985, co-author, diploma, M. Ostrovsky Prize 1986);
 a memorial "Defenders of the Motherland" (Borova 1987);
 Lenin Park (1987) and Children's playground (1988; Belgorod, Russian Federation);
 a series of commemorative medals and badges (1982–89);
 decoration of ukrainian-russian restaurant in Dubai (UAE, 1996);
 graphics – "Old Tallinn" (1965), "Flowering Time" (1966), "Rus" (1967), "Begonia" (1980), "Morning in the Mountains" (1983) etc.;

Author of state and departmental awards of Ukraine 

 Order "For Courage", 3 classes (1995, State Award of Ukraine)
 Honorary award of the Ministry of Internal Affairs of Ukraine (1995, Ministry of Internal Affairs)
 Honorary award "For achievement"  (1995, Ministry of Internal Affairs)
 Honorary award "The best fire brigade worker" (1995, Ministry of Internal Affairs, Ministry of Emergency Situations of Ukraine)
 Honorary award "Security Service of Ukraine" (1996, Security Service of Ukraine)
 Honorary award "Cross of Glory" (1997, Ministry of Internal Affairs)
 Honorary award "Honorary Border Guard of Ukraine", logo, souvenirs (1997, State Border Guard Service)
 Honorary jubilee award of the Supreme Arbitration Court of Ukraine (2001, Supreme Arbitration Court of Ukraine)
 Medal "For courage in protecting the state border of Ukraine" (2000, State Border Guard Service)
 Medal "For Impeccable Service", 4 classes (2002, State Border Guard Service)
 Peacekeeping Medal (2003, Ministry of Internal Affairs, Ministry of Defence)

Citations

General sources 
This article is a partial translation of the corresponding article in the Ukrainian Wikipedia, :uk:Лебідь Микола Якович

 Ігор Кромф. Наймасовіша нагорода за подвиги: 25 років ордену «За мужність» // Прямий - 2020, 29 квітня
 Селівачов М.// Микола Лебідь: акварель, дизайн, геральдика - К.: ВХ [Студіо], 2006
 Селівачов М., Микола Лебідь // Ант. Вип. 16-18. — К., 2006. — С.107
 Сопов О., Торгоненко А.. // Енциклопедичне видання "Нагороди МВС України" - 2016 - С.8-12, 14-19, 52-55, 66
 Сопов О., Торгоненко А.. Піонери відомчих відзнак // Іменем закону. - 2011-03-31, №13
 Лазаренко В. Історія створення медалі «За мужність в охороні державного кордону України» // Нумізматика і Фалеристика. - 2008, N21.
 Лазаренко В. Почесна Відзнака Президента України - від відзнаки до державної нагороди (1992-2002 рр.) // Нумізматика і Фалеристика. - 2008, N22.
 Николай Яковлевич Лебедь. Фотоальбом // в журн. «Ландшафт плюс». - М. - 2005, №1.
 Геральдика як засіб відродження історичних традицій України // 24 карати. - 2005. - Осінь-зима.
 Вольвач П., Ляшко В.. Радіожурнал “Віта Нова”: Художник Микола Лебідь (з аудіозаписом радіоефіру) // Радіо Свобода - 18 травня 2004
 Микола Лебідь // Хто є хто. Київ та регіони. - 2003-2005. - Випуск V, VI.
 Walter Belanger. Mykola Lebid // Contempoartukraine. Kyiv Pechersk Lavra Studios — Ukraine, Contempoartukraine, 2004, #3 — p. 28-33 (in English and Ukrainian)
 Довідник членів Національної спілки художників України - К., 2003. С.189
 Тимченко С. Легкокрила творчість // Київський Політехнік. - 2002. - 18 квітня.
 Лазаренко В. Из истории награждения за выслугу лет (Пограничные войска Украины, 2002 г.) // Нумізматика і Фалеристика. - 2002, №4.
 Загородня 3. Пензлем крилатої душі // Міліція України. - 2000, №4.
 Никитюк І. Нова прикордонна символіка та її автор // Кордон. -1999, №1.
 Відзнаки Президента України. К. Мистецтво. -1999.
 Загородня 3. І музикою пензель обізветься // Київська правда. - 1998. - 19-25 березня.
 Довідник членів Спілки художників України - К., 1998. С.83
 Бузало В. Відзнаки особливого ґатунку. Історія створення // Міліція України. - 1997, №1.
 Куфрик Б. Як народжуються державні нагороди? // Експрес. - 1997. - 3-11 травня.
 Нерод В. Автор почетных знаков отличия и наград //День. - 1997. - 5 апреля.
 Нерод В. Поєднання знання і таланту// Іменем закону. - 1997. -17 січня.
 Нагороди України. Історія, факти, документи. У 3-х томах. - К. - 1996, т.З.
 Пацера Н. «Остепеняются» и множатся президентские награды // Киевские ведомости. - 1996. -24 мая.
 Бузало В. Нагороди незалежної України //Українська Газета. - 1996. - 22 лютого.
 Нет ордена в своем отечестве? // Киевские ведомости. - 1995. - 27 апреля.
 Пам’ятки України. Спеціальний випуск на замовлення Президента України. 1995. №2, стор.15
 Чеберяко Н. «І на тім рушничкові...» //Вечерний Киев. - 1986.-9 октября.
 Шуйская Г. Приглашает «рушник» //Правда Украины. -1985.-25 июля.
 Фоменко К. Приглашает «рушничок» //Комсомольское знамя. - 1985. - 27 июля.
 Петруня О. «Рушник» запрошує гостей // Прапор комунізму. -1985. - 28 липня.
 Шуйская Г. Приглашает рушничок // Правда (Москва). - 1985. - 25 июня.
 Довідник «Українські радянські художники» - К., Мистецтво, 1972. С.256

External links 
 instagram official @mykola.lebid.art 
 facebook official @Mykola.Lebid.Art
 Entry in artchive.ru 
 Entry in socrealizm.com.ua 
 Entry in the Encyclopedia of Modern Ukraine 
 Entry in the Encyclopedia "Kyiv and the regions. Who Is Who 2004–2005. VI issue" - Kyiv 2005 

Ukrainian painters
Ukrainian artists
Ukrainian contemporary artists
21st-century Ukrainian painters
21st-century Ukrainian male artists
20th-century Ukrainian painters
20th-century Ukrainian male artists
Ukrainian watercolourists
Ukrainian male painters
Ukrainian designers
Saint Petersburg Stieglitz State Academy of Art and Design alumni
Soviet artists
Soviet painters
1936 births
2007 deaths